Events from the year 1929 in Michigan.

Office holders

State office holders
 Governor of Michigan: Fred W. Green (Republican)
 Lieutenant Governor of Michigan: Luren Dickinson (Republican) 
 Michigan Attorney General: Wilber M. Brucker (Republican)
 Michigan Secretary of State: John S. Haggerty (Republican)
 Speaker of the Michigan House of Representatives: Fred R. Ming (Republican)
 Chief Justice, Michigan Supreme Court:

Mayors of major cities
 Mayor of Detroit: John C. Lodge
 Mayor of Grand Rapids: 
 Mayor of Flint: Ray A. Brownell
 Mayor of Lansing: Laird J. Troyer
 Mayor of Saginaw:

Federal office holders

 U.S. Senator from Michigan: James J. Couzens (Republican)
 U.S. Senator from Michigan: Arthur Vandenberg (Republican) 
 House District 1: Robert H. Clancy (Republican)
 House District 2: Earl C. Michener (Republican)
 House District 3: Joseph L. Hooper (Republican)
 House District 4: John C. Ketcham (Republican)
 House District 5: Carl E. Mapes (Republican)
 House District 6: Grant M. Hudson (Republican)
 House District 7: Louis C. Cramton (Republican)
 House District 8: Bird J. Vincent (Republican)
 House District 9: James C. McLaughlin (Republican)
 House District 10: Roy O. Woodruff (Republican)
 House District 11: Frank P. Bohn (Republican)
 House District 12: W. Frank James (Republican)
 House District 13: Clarence J. McLeod (Republican)

Population

Sports

Baseball
 1929 Detroit Tigers season – Under manager Bucky Harris, the Tigers compiled a 70–84 record and finished in sixth place in the American League. The team's statistical leaders included Harry Heilmann with a .344 batting average, Dale Alexander with 25 home runs and 137 RBIs, and George Uhle with 15 wins and a 4.08 earned run average.

American football
 1929 Detroit Titans football team – The Titans compiled a 7–1–1 record under head coach Gus Dorais.
 1929 Michigan State Normal Hurons football team – Under head coach Elton Rynearson, the Hurons compiled a 5–1–2 record, tied for the Michigan Collegiate Conference championship, and outscored opponents by a combined total of 156 to 45.
 1929 Western State Hilltoppers football team – In their first season under head coach Mike Gary, the Hilltoppers compiled a 5–2–1 record, tied for the Michigan Collegiate Conference championship, and outscored opponents, 161 to 44.
 1929 Michigan Wolverines football team – The Wolverines compiled a 5–3–1 record and tied for seventh place in the Big Ten Conference.
 1929 Michigan State Spartans football team – Under head coach Jim Crowley, the Spartans compiled a 5–3 record.
 1929 Central State Bearcats football team – Under head coach Butch Nowack, the team compiled a 2–3–2 record and was outscored by a total of 80 to 71.

Basketball
 1928–29 Michigan Wolverines men's basketball team – Under head coach George Veenker, the Wolverines compiled a 13–3 record and were co-champions of the Big Ten Conference.

Ice hockey
 1928–29 Detroit Cougars season – Under general manager and coach Jack Adams, the Red Wings compiled a 19–16–9 record. The team's statistical leaders included Carson Cooper with 18 goals, 9 assists, and 27 points. Dolly Dolson was the team's goaltender.

Chronology of events

January

February

March

April

May
14441 Wilshire, Detroit mich

June

July

August

September

October

November

December

Births
 January 20 - Arte Johnson in Benton Harbor, Michigan
 April 16 - Dorne Dibble in Adrian, Michigan
 May 16 - Betty Carter in Flint, Michigan
 May 16 - John Conyers in Highland Park, Michigan
 July 20 - Mike Ilitch in Detroit
 September 16 - Dale Kildee in Flint, Michigan
 November 28 - Berry Gordy in Detroit

Deaths
 February 8 - Edwin Denby, 42nd United States Secretary of the Navy, at age 58 in Detroit
 July 19 - Henry McMorran, at age 85 in Port Huron, Michigan

See also
 History of Michigan
 History of Detroit

References